In queueing theory, a discipline within the mathematical theory of probability, the M/M/c queue (or Erlang–C model) is a multi-server queueing model. In Kendall's notation it describes a system where arrivals form a single queue and are governed by a Poisson process, there are  servers, and job service times are exponentially distributed. It is a generalisation of the M/M/1 queue which considers only a single server. The model with infinitely many servers is the M/M/∞ queue.

Model definition

An M/M/c queue is a stochastic process whose state space is the set {0, 1, 2, 3, ...} where the value corresponds to the number of customers in the system, including any currently in service.

 Arrivals occur at rate  according to a Poisson process and move the process from state  to +1.
 Service times have an exponential distribution with parameter . If there are fewer than  jobs, some of the servers will be idle. If there are more than  jobs, the jobs queue in a buffer.
 The buffer is of infinite size, so there is no limit on the number of customers it can contain.

The model can be described as a continuous time Markov chain with transition rate matrix

on the state space  The model is a type of birth–death process. We write  = /() for the server utilization and require  < 1  for the queue to be stable.  represents the average proportion of time which each of the servers is occupied (assuming jobs finding more than one vacant server choose their servers randomly).

The state space diagram for this chain is as below.

Stationary analysis

Number of customers in the system

If the traffic intensity is greater than one then the queue will grow without bound but if server utilization  then the system has a stationary distribution with probability mass function

where  is the probability that the system contains  customers.

The probability that an arriving customer is forced to join the queue (all servers are occupied) is given by

which is referred to as Erlang's C formula and is often denoted C(/) or E2,(/). The average number of customers in the system (in service and in the queue) is given by

Busy period of server

The busy period of the M/M/c queue can either refer to:
full busy period: the time period between an arrival which finds −1 customers in the system until a departure which leaves the system with −1 customers
partial busy period: the time period between an arrival which finds the system empty until a departure which leaves the system again empty.

Then
 For  = ,
 For  < ,

Response time

The response time is the total amount of time a customer spends in  both the queue and in service. The average response time is the same for all work conserving service disciplines and is

Customers in first-come, first-served discipline

The customer either experiences an immediate exponential service, or must wait for  customers to be served before their own service, thus experiencing an Erlang distribution with shape parameter  + 1.

Customers in processor sharing discipline

In a processor sharing queue the service capacity of the queue is split equally between the jobs in the queue. However, when there are more than  jobs in the system the service rate of each job decreases and is  where  is the number of jobs in the system. This means that arrivals after a job of interest can impact the service time of the job of interest. The Laplace–Stieltjes transform of the response time distribution has been shown to be a solution to a Volterra integral equation from which moments can be computed. An approximation has been offered for the response time distribution.

Finite capacity

In an M/M// queue only  customers can queue at any one time (including those in service). Any further arrivals to the queue are considered "lost". We assume that  ≥ . The model has transition rate matrix

on the state space {0, 1, 2, ..., ..., }. In the case where  = , the M/M// queue is also known as the Erlang–B model.

Transient analysis
See Takács for a transient solution and Stadje for busy period results.

Stationary analysis
Stationary probabilities are given by

The average number of customers in the system is 

and the average time in the system for a customer is 

The average time in the queue for a customer is 

The average number of customers in the queue can be obtained by using the effective arrival rate. The effective arrival rate is calculated by 

Thus we can obtain the average number of customers in the queue by 

An implementation of the above calculations in Python can be found.

Heavy-traffic limits

Writing for the number of customers in the system at time , it can be shown that under three different conditions the process

converges to a diffusion process.

 Fix as a constant  where
and increase  and  using the scale  =  or  = 1/(1 − )2. This case is called the Halfin–Whitt regime.

See also

 Spectral expansion solution
 M/G/k queue

References

Single queueing nodes